Mark Nordstrom is an American bishop of the Anglican Church in North America. A retired U.S. Army chaplain, he was consecrated in 2018 as bishop suffragan in the ACNA's Jurisdiction of the Armed Forces and Chaplaincy (JAFC).

Early life and education
Nordstrom joined the Army at age 18 and served for six years as a military policeman, followed by six years serving in two civilian churches. Nordstrom married Christine Patrizio in 1979, with whom he had three children and six grandchildren. His two sons also served in the Army.

In 1987, Nordstrom entered ordained ministry in Baptist churches. He graduated from Dallas Theological Seminary with an M.Th. and holds undergraduate degrees in aviation science and general studies.

Chaplaincy career

In 1990, Nordstrom returned to military service under a direct commission as a chaplain. His assignments as a chaplain included light infantry battalions, a field artillery battalion and a mechanized infantry brigade. He was also an observer controller at the Combat Maneuver Training Center in Hohenfels, Germany, and in the Combat Developments Directorate of the U.S. Army Chaplain Center and School in Fort Jackson, South Carolina. He later served as operations officer for the Command Chaplain, United States Army Europe and 7th Army; force management officer for the Army Chief of Chaplains at the Pentagon; and director of training and leader development at the U.S. Army Chaplain Center and School. 

Nordstrom served in joint relief operations for Hurricane Iniki, and he deployed as a brigade chaplain for two tours during Operation Iraqi Freedom, once with the initial entry forces. He received the Presidential Unit Citation, the Bronze Star Medal with Oak Leaf Cluster, the Meritorious Service Medal with three Oak Leaf Clusters, the Army Achievement Medal, Good Conduct Medal, the National Defense Service Medal with two bronze stars, the Iraq Campaign Medal with three campaign stars, the Global War on Terrorism Expeditionary Medal, Global War on Terrorism Service Medal, Humanitarian Service Medal, the Overseas Service Ribbon with numeral four, the Hawaii National Guard Medal For Merit, the Combat Action Badge, and the Air Assault Badge. He retired from the Army with the rank of colonel.

Episcopacy

In 2010, Nordstrom was ordained in the Anglican Church in North America. During his Pentagon service, he also served as volunteer clergy at The Falls Church Anglican. After his retirement, he joined the staff of the JAFC as vicar general. Nordstrom was consecrated as JAFC bishop suffragan alongside Michael Williams on April 12, 2018, in Birmingham, Alabama. As bishop suffragan, Nordstrom oversees pastoral care and support for chaplains and their family members. Like other JAFC bishops, his canonical residence was in the Church of Nigeria North American Mission until 2021, when the JAFC completed the canonical process for removing its residence in the Church of Nigeria and becoming canonically resident in the ACNA.

References

External links
JAFC biography

Living people
21st-century Anglican bishops in the United States
Bishops of the Anglican Church in North America
Year of birth missing (living people)
Recipients of the Presidential Unit Citation (United States)
Recipients of the Meritorious Service Medal (United States)